Fermignano (Romagnol: Fermignèn) is a comune (municipality) in the Province of Pesaro e Urbino in the Italian region Marche, located about  west of Ancona and about  southwest of Pesaro.

Renaissance architect Donato Bramante was born here.

History
Fermignano's history can be traced to 200 BC, with the name probably deriving from someone named Firmidio. The city grew up around a bridge over the Metauro river. Over the centuries, Fermignano was under the jurisdiction of the Duchy of Urbino. From 1607, it was given its own administrative council.

References

External links
History of Fermignano 

Cities and towns in the Marche